Tennessee's Partner is a 1955 American Western film directed by Allan Dwan, written by Graham Baker, D. D. Beauchamp, Milton Krims, and Teddi Sherman, with uncredited rewrites by Dwan, and starring John Payne, Ronald Reagan, Rhonda Fleming, and Coleen Gray.

The film was released by RKO Radio Pictures, which was then owned by industrialist Howard Hughes. While the film is based upon one of Bret Harte's most popular short stories, "Tennessee’s Pardner," it departs significantly from the original storyline. The 1869 Harte story has also been filmed as Tennessee's Pardner (1916), The Flaming Forties (1924), and The Golden Princess (1925).

Plot

Cast
 John Payne as Tennessee
 Ronald Reagan as Cowpoke
 Rhonda Fleming as Elizabeth "Duchess" Farnham
 Coleen Gray as Goldie Slater
 Tony Caruso as Turner
 Morris Ankrum as Judge Parker
 Leo Gordon as the Sheriff
 Chubby Johnson as Grubstake McNiven
 Joe Deviln as Prendergast
 Myron Healey as Reynolds
 John Mansfield as Clifford
 Angie Dickinson (uncredited) as Abby Dean

Legacy
This film inspired one of the greatest hits of The Four Seasons. As the character based on Bob Gaudio explains in the musical Jersey Boys, "I'm watching the million dollar movie. Some cheesy John Payne western. He hauls off and smacks Rhonda Fleming across the mouth and says, 'What do you think of that?' She looks up at him defiant, proud, eyes glistening – and she says, 'Big girls don't cry.'"

See also
 List of American films of 1955
 Ronald Reagan filmography

References

External links

1955 films
RKO Pictures films
1955 Western (genre) films
American Western (genre) films
Films based on short fiction
Films directed by Allan Dwan
Films shot in Los Angeles
Films based on works by Bret Harte
1950s English-language films
1950s American films